Isaac Getz is an author, conference speaker, and currently holds the post of Professor at ESCP Business School. He specializes in the areas of organizational behavior, leadership and organizational transformation and has been instrumental for the corporate liberation movement involving hundreds of companies and institutions.

Biography 
In 2009, he co-published the book Freedom, Inc. with Brian M. Carney, which introduced the concept of “freedom-based company” or “liberated company”. Based on the field study of several dozen companies, such as W. L. Gore, USAA, Harley Davidson, Sun Hydraulics, Richards Group, IDEO, Chaparral Steel, FAVI, and SOL, it described the role of corporate—liberating—leaders to build organizational environment based on freedom and responsibility. The revised and expanded edition has been published in 2016. Book’s editions have also appeared in Sweden, Hungary, Czech Republic, Netherlands, India, Israel, China, Romania, Italy, Spain, and South Korea and is forthcoming in Japan. In 2019, he co-published the book L'entreprise altruiste with Laurent Marbacher, which introduced the concept of the “altruistic corporation”.

Publications 
 Isaac Getz (Ed.), Créativité organisationnelle, Paris, Vuibert, 2002, 160p.; texts by Teresa Amabile, James Averill, Todd Lubart, Robert Sternberg, and others.
 Isaac Getz & Alan Robinson, Vos idées changent tout ! [Your ideas change everything], Paris, Éd. d'Organisation, 2003 (2nd edition, 2007), 209 p.; editions in German, Dutch, Italian, and Spanish.
 Brian M. Carney & Isaac Getz, Freedom, Inc., New York, Crown Business/Random House, 2009, 304 p. (revised and expanded edition, Argo Navis/Perseus Books, 2016), 400 p.
 La liberté, ça marche ! [Freedom works!], Paris, Flammarion, 2016, (expanded edition, 2020), 374 p.; texts by James MacGregor Burns, Robert Greenleaf, Max De Pree, Bill Gore, Bob Koski, Robert Townsend, Bob Davids, John Wooden, Robert McDermott, Ricardo Semler, and others.
 L'entreprise libérée [Liberated company], Paris, Fayard, 2017, (expanded edition, 2019), 482p.
 Robert Davids, Brian M. Carney & Isaac Getz, Leadership Without Ego, London, Palgrave MacMillan, 2019, 191 p.; editions in French and Spanish.
 Isaac Getz & Laurent Marbacher, L'entreprise altruiste [The altruistic corporation], Paris, Albin Michel, 2019, 528 p.; forthcoming edition in Chinese.
 Isaac Getz (Summer 2009), « Liberating Leadership: How the Initiative-Freeing Radical Organizational Form Has Been Successfully Adopted », California Management Review, Vol 51, N°4, pp. 32–58, on cmr.ucpress.edu (Retrieved May 10, 2017).
 Isaac Getz (March 2011), « 1960s’ Lessons Learned: Liberating Leadership and Transformational Scholarship», Journal of Management Inquiry, Vol 20, N°1, pp. 8–12 , on promostudio.info (Retrieved January 2, 2018).
 Isaac Getz (2019), The transformation: How Michelin redefined the twenty-first century industrial corporation, in The Transformation Playbook: Insights, Wisdom and Best Practices to Make Transformation Reality, Wargrave, UK: Brightline/Thinkers50, pp. 74–78 , on brightline.org. Retrieved 28 August 2020.
 Isaac Getz and Laurent Marbacher (Autumn 2020), A lesson in creating successful companies that care, Strategy+Business, Issue 100, pp 28–31.  Retrieved 30 August 2020.

Awards and distinctions 
 The article "Liberating Leadership: How the initiative-freeing radical organizational form has been successfully adopted", California Management Review received the Academic Award from SYNTEC Management Consulting in 2010 for the best article of a French researcher in the category “Management / Human Resources / Organization".
 The 2016 study by FNEGE (French national foundation for management education) of 1600 French managers ranked Isaac Getz as the fourth most influential living author in the world, in the field of management.
 Thinkers50 have shortlisted Isaac’s work on corporate liberation and on the altruistic corporation for its 2019 Breakthrough Idea Award.
 Marconi Institute for Creativity, part of the Fondazione Guglielmo Marconi gave Isaac Getz the 2020 Marconi Creativity Award for "his groundbreaking work on creative organizational approaches based on freedom and altruism."

Notes and references

External links 
 Isaac Getz official website 
 Isaac Getz presentation on the site of ESCP Business School
 blog related to the book Freedom, Inc. and to corporate liberation movement

Year of birth missing (living people)
Living people
French writers